Thakur Zorawar Singh Barhath (12 September 1883 — 17 October 1939) was an Indian revolutionary and anti-British activist. He is known for the assassination attempt on the Viceroy of India, Lord Hardinge by throwing a bomb on him during the procession in New Delhi. He is also called "Chandra Shekhar Azad of Rajasthan".

Thakur Zorawar Singh was part of the celebrated Barhath Family of Shahpura(Bhilwara) whose members were prominent revolutionary leaders in the freedom struggle against the British Raj. Thakur Krishna Singh Barhath, his sons Thakur Kesari Singh Barhath and Thakur Zorawar Singh Barhath and grandson Kunwar Pratap Singh Barhath(son of Thakur Kesari Singh) took an active part in the freedom struggle and devoted their lives and belongings for the cause of Indian Independence. Zorawar Singh spent the last 3 decades of his life in the attire of saint, under the pseudo name Baba Amardas Bairagi.

Early life 
Zorawar Singh was born on 12 September 1883 in Devpura (Shahpura State) to father Thakur Krishna Singh Barhath. The Barhath family of Shahpura were affluent jagirdars of Rajputana and belonged to Sauda clan of Charans. In Udaipur, he received primary education and completed secondary education in Jodhpur. Zorawar Singh's childhood was spent in close company of the aristocratic families of Shahpura, Udaipur, and Jodhpur. He was married to Anop Kanwar, the daughter of Thakur Takhtsingh of Atraliya thikana in Kota State.

Kamdar of Maharani of Jodhpur 
After the death of his father, Thakur Krishna Singh, Zorawar Singh joined the Marwar Court as the Kamdar of Maharani of Jodhpur. It was here that Zorawar Singh met Bhai Balmukund who worked as a tutor for the princes.

Turn to revolution 
 
At the instance of his elder brother Thakur Kesari Singh, Zorawar Singh joined the revolutionaries in Delhi accompanied by Master Amir Chand and Rash Bihari Bose.

Although Thakur Keshari Singh was in a high position in the native states, he was also secretly connected to the Revolutionary party. He had sent his younger brother Thakur Zoravar Singh Barahth, his son Pratap Singh Barahth and son-in-law Ishwar Dan Ashiya to Master Amirchand.

Delhi conspiracy case (Hardinge bomb case 1912) 
Source:

In December 1912, Lord Hardinge, the new Governor-General of British India arrived in Delhi. A royal procession presided by Lord Hardinge was announced in the celebration of the shifting of the capital from Kolkata to Delhi. A plan was hatched by revolutionaries headed by Rash Bihari Bose and Thakur Kesari Singh to assassinate Lord Hardinge. Zorawar Singh was in close touch with revolutionaries like Ras Bihari Bose and was part of the conspiracy to kill Governor-General Lord Hardinge during his ceremonial procession in Delhi. Zorawar Singh, along with his nephew, Pratap Singh, took the responsibility to throw a bomb at Lord Harding during this procession. On 23 December 1912, Zorawar Singh and Pratap Singh went to the roof of the building of Marwari College in Chandni Chowk, Delhi. They wore a disguise and went on the roof, where Zorawar Singh threw a bomb directed at Lord Hardinge, who was riding on the back of an elephant along with his wife and guards. Hardinge was seriously wounded at the impact of the bomb but survived while one of his bodyguards died on the spot.

Aftermath 
After the bombing, both Zorawar Singh and his nephew Pratap Singh absconded from the place and remained hidden.

Rash Bihari Bose, who co-planned the conspiracy, also went into hiding. He remained underground in Nuddea (West Bengal).

After the bombing, the police and the army immediately surrounded all the houses, all the houses were searched but no one could be caught. An award of one lakh rupees was announced by the British Government of India to the person who captures the culprit. In order to show their allegiance, the Maharajas of each native princely state announced a separate award to find the bomber. The amount of all the prizes increased to several crores of rupees but the Indian police and the intelligence of Scotland Yard could not trace the bomber.

Kunwar Pratap Singh and his brother-in-law, Ishwar Dan Ashiya, were arrested but later released due to lack of evidence. Subsequently, Zorawar Singh & Pratap Singh, who were also wanted in other cases, absconded. Police made efforts but failed to arrest them. Attractive prizes were announced for those who could give any clues about Zorawar Singh and Pratap Singh. Zorawar Singh would never be caught and remained underground for his whole life.

Injuries caused by this assassination attempt led to rumours of Lord Hardinge's imminent death. Though he survived, he suffered from neuritis and hearing loss even months later.

Escape from Delhi 
Zoravar Singh and  Pratap Singh had to escape Delhi and they came to the banks of Yamuna. They couldn't cross at the time since there was flooding in the river. For seven hours, Pratap Singh sometimes swam, sometimes dived and sometimes hanged by the chains of the bridge. When it got dark enough, they swam across the river. Pratap Singh was very tired, when he reached the shore, and fell unconscious. Two police constables who saw him crossing became suspicious of him. Zoravar Singh slashed both of them with his sword and carried Pratap Singh on his back.

When Zorawar Singh & Pratap Singh left from Delhi after throwing the bomb, they walked about forty miles in a day. A spy followed them from there. After a few days, when they were leaving the border of Banswara, the spy alerted the Nakadar and told him to catch them. Zoravar Singh immediately razed that Nakadar with his sword and both of them fled from there.

Reactions 
The revolutionaries distributed a secret communique praising this incident, which stated:"Gita, Vedas, Quran all instruct us that it is our religious duty to kill the enemy of the motherland, irrespective of caste, creed, race and religion. We do not talk about other big and small revolutionary works, but last December the divine power that appeared in Delhi is a unquestionable proof that God himself is changing the fate of India."Famed nationalist Lala Lajpat Rai has written in his biography that "the person who threw the bomb on Lord Hardinge on 12 December 1911 had done a memorable deed to be remembered for generations. The courage and bravery of this man cannot be matched. What is even more encouraging is that all the means and power of a mighty glorious empire have proved incapable of finding that heroic till date. That person was none other than Thakur Zorawar Singh Barhath of Shahpura."

Jodhpur Mahant conspiracy 
Revolutionaries guided by Thakur Kesari Singh planned to kill a wealthy corrupt Mahant from Jodhpur, Pyarelal, to gather money from anti-British projects. According to the plan, Pyarelal was to be brought to Kota from Jodhpur by Ram Karan. His lodging arrangements were made in the Charan Rajput Boarding House. Hiralal Lahiri killed Pyarelal on 25 June 1912. Despite a vehement search by the police, they couldn't arrest anybody till after six months when a letter written by Ram Karan to Thakur Kesari Singh in code language was recovered. In this letter, Ram Karan had stated that the "flour might have become rotten by then and may be, therefore, thrown to the fishes in the Chambal." This was interpreted to mean that the remains of Pyarelal should now be thrown into the river to remove any sign of evidence.

When the conspiracy came to light during the search at Arjun Lal Sethi's school at Indore, Thakur Kesari Singh Barhath, Hira Lal Lahiri, Ram Karan and Hiralal Jalori were arrested. During the trial, one of the accused, Laxmi Lal Kayastha, turned approver and corroborated with the British government and Thakur Kesari Singh was sentenced to 20 years of rigorous imprisonment.

The princely State of Kota put a reward of Rs.500 for the capture of Zorawar Singh in the Pyarelal Murder case. He was never arrested or found.

Arrah conspiracy case/Nimej murder case 
After the Delhi Bomb(Delhi Conspiracy Case) outrage, revolutionaries led by Zorawar Singh committed many dacoities in UP and Bihar for the want of funds one of which was Arrah Conspiracy also known as Nimej Murder Case. Zorawar Singh was the chief accused in the Arrah Conspiracy Case. Revolutionaries led by him had attacked a Jain upasar located in Arrah (Bihar) in which a mahant was killed in the encounter. The mahant was believed to be a close confidant of British authorities. A person named Shivnarayan turned informer for the British government. British authorities released a warrant & later kill at sight order for Zoarwar Singh but he evaded them and wasn't caught.

Ravines of Central India 
Source:

Sensing the heat of the Colonial Police force around him increase, Zorawar Singh left for the ravines of Central India & Rajasthan. He made his residence in this region and remained there for the rest of his life. Sometimes, he managed to secretly meet with his wife and family members for short durations.

For 27 consecutive years, he roamed in the jungles and hills of Rajasthan, Central India. He had changed his name to Baba Amardas Bairagi and lived in the guise of a sage.

In the latter years, he lived mostly in the kingdom of Sitamau. There Maniraj Singh Jagawat came in close contact with him. Zoravar Singh narrated to him the bombing on Lord Hardinge:"When Lord Hardinge came out sitting on the cistern, I myself fired at him from a high building. When we(Zorawar Singh & Pratap Singh) came out of Delhi after throwing the bomb, we walked about forty miles in a day. A spy followed us from there. After a few days, when we were leaving the border of Banswara, the spy called the Nakadar and told him to catch this person. Zoravar Singh immediately razed that Nakadar with his sword and both of them fled from there."A few years before shifting to Central India, Thakur Zorawar Singh had shown the place from where he had dropped the bomb in Chandni Chowk, Delhi to Rajlakshmi Devi, granddaughter of his elder brother Thakur Kesari Singh.

Death 
To catch Zoravar Singh, the Kota government and the Bihar government had announced big rewards, but the revolutionary altered his dress and speech and assumed such a form that even the British CID department could not be successful in capturing him. In the Arrah Conspiracy case of Bihar, Zoravar Singh was sentenced to death, but again could not be caught.

In 1937, for the first time, Congress successfully won provincial elections in multiple states across British India and formed governments. It was opportune moment so Congress leaders and Thakur Kesari Singh, who had been released from prison in 1920, made efforts to nullify the death warrant issued against Zorawar Singh in Arrah Conspiracy. He met Purshottam Das Tandon, the Bihar Chief Minister Shri Krishna Sinha and the Home Secretary Anugraha Narayan Sinha to cancel the warrant. Unfortunately, before the efforts could frutify, Zorawar Singh became ill with pneumonia and without proper treatment, he died in 1939.

27 years after throwing the bomb on Lord Hardinge, dedicating himself to the freedom of the motherland while living underground, he died on 17 October 1939.

Fateh Singh Manav has said:"From Bang-Bhang (Partition of Bengal-1905) to the last revolution of 1942, in all the sacrifices that were made in the freedom struggle of India, if those men are kept in comparison with the incomparable sacrifice, unparalleled patience and infinite suffering tolerance, then the place of Zoravar Singh will be the highest among martyrs."

Quotes

Jagjivan Ram 
Jagjivan Ram, former Deputy Prime Minister of India:–"Shri Kesari Singh, his brother Zorawar Singh and Shri Pratap Singh were the brave martyrs from Rajasthan but not only Rajasthan but the whole of India, especially Bihar, where we are equally proud of their martyrdom."

Raghubir Singh Sitamau 
Raghubir Singh, the last ruler of Sitamau princely state:–"Barhath-putra Pratap Singh sacrificed his life, Barhath Kesari Singh did not shirk from his duty even after losing everything and suffering many tortures and his brother Zorawar Singh spent the last twenty five years of his life wandering in Chambal Kanthe completely unknown."

Ashok Gehlot 
Ashok Gehlot, 14th Chief Minister of Rajasthan:–"Rajasthan, the land of bravery and valor, was also second to none in the freedom struggle of the country. I pay homage to Shri Kesari Singh Barhath, Shri Zorawar Singh Barhath and Kunwar Pratap Singh Barhath. I am sure that his immortal story will become a powerful medium in the resurgence of the society."

Haridev Joshi 
Haridev Joshi, former Chief Minister of Rajasthan on 25 April 1976:–"Sri Kesari Singh, Sri Pratap Singh and Sri Zorawar Singh were members of the same family. They sacrificed their lives, because they believed it is better to die with self-respect than to be a slave. They led the struggle for freedom with their life. Kesari Singh sacrificed his family for the freedom of India. He stood firm throughout his life, did not break, did not fall."

Vasundhara Raje 
Vasundhara Raje, 13th Chief Minister of Rajasthan:–

"Revolutionary leaders Shri Kesari Singh Barhath and his brother Zorawar Singh Barhath and son Pratap Singh Barhath have made valuable contributions to the freedom movement. The entire family of Shri Barhath has sacrificed everything in the freedom movement. They are all our sources of inspiration."

Legacy 
Zorawar Singh along with other members of Barhath family of Shahpura are taught as part of secondary syllabus in RBSC board in Rajasthan.

Kesari Singh Barhath Panorama 
In November 2022, Rajasthan Chief Minister Ashok Gehlot has approved a proposal of Rs 4 crore for the construction of a panorama of freedom fighter Kesari Singh Barath at Shahpura in Bhilwara, which will include a main panorama building, boundary wall, path-way, auditorium, library, audio-video system, various art works, entrance, statue and inscription. The panorama will provide information about the works and personalities of the brave revolutionary members of the Barhath family and educate the younger generation about their rights.

Shaheed Mela 
Since last 50 years, from 1974 onwards, every year on 23 December, Shaeed Mela is celebrated in memory of the Barhath family. It was on this day that Zorawar Singh hurled a bomb on the British Viecroy of India in 1912. A fair is organized in their hometown at Shahpura and the event takes place at Shahid Trimurti Memorial which displays the statues of Thakur Kesari Singh, Thakur Zorawar Singh, and Kunwar Pratap Singh. The event is presided by the political class including MPs, MLAs, and local politicians.

Portraits in Delhi Assembly 
In January 2019, portraits of revolutionaries of Barhath Family including Thakur Kesari Singh Barhath, Zorawar Singh Barhath, and Kunwar Pratap Singh Barhath were placed in the gallary of Delhi Assembly.

Barhath Haveli of Shahpura 
‘Haveli of Late Shri Kesari Singh Barhath’ located in Shahpura (Bhilwara) is a State Protected Monument under the Government of Rajasthan.

At the 100th death anniversary of Pratap Singh Barhath, the Barhath Haveli of Shahpura has been converted to Shri Kesari Singh Barhath Government Museum. The haveli of the Barhath family has now become a national museum, in which their personal weapons and armaments are displayed. It was inaugurated by Onkar Singh Lakahwat and Kailash Meghwal.

Bibliography

External links 

 Amrit Mahotsav - Digital District Repository - Barhat Joravar Singh
 Charans.org (चारण समागम) - ठाकुर जोरावर सिंह बारहट

See also 
 Delhi Conspiracy case
 Thakur Kesari Singh Barhath
 Kunwar Pratap Singh Barhath
 Rash Bihari Bose

References 

Indian independence activists from Rajasthan
People from Bhilwara district
Charan
1883 births
1939 deaths
Rajasthani people
Indian Hindus
Administrators in the princely states of India
Indian nationalists
Barhath family of Shahpura
People from Rajasthan